Maria Elisa Cristobal Anson-Rodrigo (née Anson; born January 30, 1945), better known as Boots Anson-Roa, is a Filipina actress, columnist, editor, and lecturer.

Early life and education
Anson-Roa, a Bicolana, is the eldest daughter of post-war matinee idol Oscar Moreno, then known as the Robert Taylor of the Philippines, and Belen Cristobal, a descendant of Epifanio de los Santos.

She finished her primary and secondary education at the posh Assumption Convent, Manila. From 1960 to 1964 she studied for an A.B. in Speech and Drama at the  University of the Philippines, but did not graduate. From 1983 to 1984 she studied journalism and Public and Media Relations at Georgetown University, Washington D.C.

Acting career
Anson-Roa began acting in 1968, appearing opposite actors including like Dante Rivero, Joseph Estrada and Fernando Poe Jr. under Sampaguita Pictures and with Ramon Revilla Sr. She was given Lifetime Achievement awards by FAMAS and Star Awards.

Awards, honors and distinctions received
Outstanding Movie Personality: PMPC – 1979
FAMAS Award for Uplifting the Movie Industry: FAMAS Awards – 1976
Best Emcee ALIW Awards: – 1979–1981
Ten Outstanding Women in the Nation's Service Award: TOWNS Foundation – 1974
Gintong Ina Awardee: Guillermo Mendoza Foundation – 1994
Outstanding Parents of the Year: Gintong Ina Foundation – 1994-1998
Women Who Make a Difference: Soroptimist International – 1995
Outstanding Women in Media: Philippine Women's University – 1995
Outstanding Media Practitioner: Eastern Telecommunications – 1997
Outstanding Alumna: University of the Philippines – June 2000
Lifetime Achievement Award: Star Awards for Movies – March 2001
Lifetime Achievement Award: FAMAS Awards – March 2003
Best TV Actress (MMK:Kamison – 22nd Golden Dove Awards – 2014
Outstanding Manilan Award – 2017

Professional activities

Publications
Columnist/ Feature Writer: Manila–U.S. Mail – 1992–1993
Editor-in-Chief: Balikatan Herald – 1994
Columnist: Isyu (broadsheet) – 1998
Contributor: Philippine Daily Inquirer – 1995–present

Workshops/ seminars/ lectures conducted
Lecturer/Trainer on Media, Communications, Culture, Performing Arts, Public and Human Relations, Women, Family and Values

Conference/ conventions
RP-China Film Exchange Program: Beijing, China – March 2002
20th UNESCO International Media Conference: UNESCO Headquarters, Paris, France – March 1999
International Congress on Communications: Mariapolis Center, Rome, Italy – June 2000

Community involvement
Public Relations Officer: Assumption Alumnae – 1987–1993
Director for Philippine National Red Cross  from 1980 to 1982
Director for U.P.-PGH Medical Foundation from 1979 to 1981
Director/ Board Member: National Commission on the Rehabilitation of the Disabled – 1979
Director/ Resource Person: Philippine Mental Health Association, Quezon City Chapter – 1979–1980
Director for DARE (Anti-Drug Foundation)
Adviser: Philippine Association for the Deaf – 1977–1982

Civil service
Anson-Roa unsuccessfully ran for a seat in the Senate of the Philippines in 2004 under the Koalisyon ng Nagkakaisang Pilipino (KNP). She was the President of MOWELFUND, Inc. from 2002 to 2020. In 1982, she was appointed as Press Attaché and Cultural Officer as well as Special Assistant to the Ambassador at the Philippine Embassy in Washington DC.

Filmography

Film

Siete Dolores (1968)
Ang Kawatan (1969)
Adriana (1969)
Rowena (1969) Sonya
Si Darna at ang Planetman (1969) Cynthia
Wanted: Perfect Mother (1970)
Santiago! (1970) Rowena
"Ang Uliran: Imelda" (1970)
I Love Mama, I Love Papa (1971)
The Wonderful World of Music (1971)
Living Doll (1971)
Ang Kampana sa Santa Quiteria (1971)
Liezl at Ang 7 Hoods (1971)
El Vibora (1972) Cecilia
Tatay Na Si Erap (1972)
Santo Domingo (1972)
Villa Miranda (1972)
Ang Agila At Ang Araw (1973)
Zoom, Zoom, Superman! (1973) Superman's Creator
Tanikalang Dugo (1973)
Ander Di Saya Si Erap (1973)
James Wong (1973)
Paruparong Itim (1973)
May Isang Tsuper ng Taksi (1974)
Dalawa Ang Nagdalantao Sa Akin (1974)
Bawal: Asawa Mo, Asawa Ko (1974)
Sumigaw Ka Hanggang Ibig Mo! (1974)
Lulubog Lilitaw Sa Ilalim Ng Tulay (1974) Sister Elisa
Ang Manika Ay Takot sa Krus (1975)
Pagsapit ng Dilim (1975)
Anak ng Araw (1975)
Anino ng Araw (1975)
Saan Ka Pupunta Ms. Lutgarda Nicolas? (1975) Lutgarda Nicolas
Ang Pag-Ibig Ko'y Huwag Mong Sukatin (1975)
Mga Uhaw na Bulaklak (1975)
Isang Gabi, Tatlong Babae (1975)
Isinumpa (1975)
Postcards From China (1975)
The Goodfather (1975)
Ang Lihim ni Rosa Henson Sa Buhay ni Kumander Lawin (1976) Rosa Henson Averion
Tatlong Kasalanan (1976)
Daigdig ng Lagim (1976)
Hubad na Bayani (1977)
Hatiin Natin ang Gabi (1978)
Malabanan: Kilabot Hunter ng Cavite (1978)
Mga Mata ni Angelita (1978) Mother Superior
Camerino (1978)
Hermano Puli (1979)
Warrant of Arrest (1979)
Tonyong Bayawak (1979)
Angelita... Ako ang Iyong Ina (1980) Mother Superior
Hiwaga (1980)
Tembong (1980)
P.S. I Love You (1981) Isabel
Jack en Jill Sa Amerika (1988)
Doring Dorobo (1993)
The Myrna Diones Story: Lord, Have Mercy! (1993)
Kadenang Bulaklak (1993) Mrs. Hidalgo
May Minamahal (1993) Becky
Mayor Cesar Climaco (1994) Julia Floreta-Climaco
Bawal na Gamot (1994)
Grepor Butch Belgica Story (1994)
The Maggie dela Riva Story: God... Why Me? (1994)
The Anabelle Huggins Story – Ruben Ablaza Tragedy: Mea Culpa (1995)
Kahit Harangan ng Bala (1995) Aling Cedes
The Lilian Velez Story: Till Death Do Us Part (1995)
Mangarap Ka (1995) Belen
Kay Pait ng Bukas (1996)
Ama, Ina, Anak (1996) Cita Nolasco
Ibulong Mo Sa Diyos 2 (1997)
Nagmumurang Kamatis (1997)
Flames: The Movie (1997) Amparo (segment "Pangako")
May Isang Pamilya (1999) Isabel
Hinahanap-Hanap Kita (1999) Mrs. Matias
Ganito Ako Magmahal (1999)
Kapalit? (2002)
Mano Po (2002) Elisa Go
The Cory Quirino Kidnap: NBI Files (2003)
Bridal Shower (2004) Doña Vergie
Mano Po III: My Love (2004) Maria
Ilusyon (2005) Doktor
Ang Anak ni Brocka (2005)
Pepot Artista (2005) Richter
Blue Moon (2005) Cora
Ang Huling Araw ng Linggo (2006) Aling Tess (segment "Martes")
White Lady (2006) Lola Tasya
Sukob (2006) Tessie
Rekados (2006) Josefina
Mano Po 5: Gua Ai Di (2006) Ama
Angels (2007) Lola Conching (segment "Angel of Love")
Shake, Rattle & Roll 9 (2007) Lola Susana (segment "Christmas Tree")
When Love Begins (2008) Marietta Caballero
Caregiver (2008) Marissa Gonzales
One True Love (2008) Lola
Lovebirds (2008)
Tutok (2009) Lydia
Mano Po 6: A Mother's Love (2009) Jin Feng
Till My Heartaches End (2010) Tita Baby
Ang Babae Sa Sementeryo (2010) Sister Sol
Ika-Sampu (2010) Mrs. Amada dela Vega
Shake, Rattle & Roll 13 (2011) Marites
My House Husband: Ikaw Na! (2011) Lilia
Unfriend (2014) Grandma Ester
Third Eye (2014) Gloria

Television

Radio shows
Boots Talk (DZMM)
Music and Memories (DZMM)

Personal life
In 1964, Boots Anson married Pedro "Pete" Roa who was her co-host in the television show Dance-o-Rama.  They had four children. Pete Roa died in 2007.

On November 30, 2013, she was engaged to lawyer Francisco "King" Rodrigo Jr., son of Senator Francisco "Soc" Rodrigo. They married on June 14, 2014.

References

External links

1945 births
20th-century Filipino actresses
21st-century Filipino actresses
Actresses from Manila
Filipino columnists
Filipino film actresses
Filipino radio personalities
Filipino television personalities
Georgetown University alumni
Living people
Philippine Daily Inquirer people
Pwersa ng Masang Pilipino politicians
University of the Philippines alumni
Filipino women columnists